Karl Koller may refer to:
Karl Koller (ophthalmologist) (or Carl Koller, 1857–1944), Austrian ophthalmologist
Karl Koller (general) (1898–1951), German Luftwaffe general
Karl Koller (footballer) (1929–2009), Austrian football player

it:Karl Koller